Susan Roosevelt Weld is an American educator who is a former professor at Harvard specializing in ancient Chinese civilization and law.  She also was General Counsel to the Congressional-Executive Commission on China.  She was the First Lady of Massachusetts from 1991 until 1997.

Career

Weld is currently an Adjunct Professor and Executive Director of the Law Asia Leadership program at Georgetown University Law School. She serves on the Advisory Council of the US-China Education Trust.

Personal life and ancestry 
She is the daughter of Quentin Roosevelt II, and Frances Blanche Webb, and granddaughter of Theodore Roosevelt Jr., great-granddaughter of Theodore Roosevelt. She is the grand-niece of Kermit Roosevelt, Quentin Roosevelt, Archibald Roosevelt, Ethel Roosevelt Derby and Alice Roosevelt Longworth.

She graduated from Radcliffe College of Harvard University in 1970, from Harvard Law School in 1974, and from Harvard University with a PhD, in 1990, in East Asian Languages and Civilizations.

She was married to former Massachusetts governor William Weld from July 7, 1975 until she divorced him in 2002.
She is the mother of five children by Weld: David Minot, Ethel Derby, Mary Blake, Quentin Roosevelt and Frances Wylie.

She is a second cousin of her former husband's opponent in the 1994 Massachusetts gubernatorial race, Mark Roosevelt, grandson of her grandfather's brother Kermit Roosevelt.

Selected works

Books
Covenant in Jin's Walled Cities: The Discoveries at Houma and Wenxian,  Harvard University Press, 1990.

References

See also
 Weld family

 
Year of birth missing (living people)
Living people
Roosevelt family
Schuyler family
First Ladies and Gentlemen of Massachusetts
American people of Dutch descent
Harvard University faculty
Bulloch family
Radcliffe College alumni
Georgetown University Law Center faculty
Harvard Law School alumni